Rosella O'Connor Russell (October 24, 1883 - February 1, 1952) was a vaudeville star from about 1912 to the late 1940s on the Columbia circuit.

Biography
She was born in the Worcester area of Massachusetts and began her career as a pianist in the silent movie theaters the Palace and the Dreamland in the Boston area. She moved into vaudeville, joining Al Reeves show "Big Burlesque Review" both with a piano act and acting in light comedy routines. Her piano specialty was playing pop tunes of the day in a classical arrangement. Her playing was so popular that it often "stopped" the show, the audience demanding she keep playing. Newspaper profiles of the day credit her with attending the New England Conservatory of Music, but this cannot be confirmed by their records.

She married Harry Kennedy Morton, a fellow vaudevillian.   She had one son, Harold Morton, Jr., who died in childhood.

She died on February 1, 1952, in the Somerville, Massachusetts, area.  Her husband died in May 1956.

Broadway productions
Blossom Time, Sep 4, 1943 - Oct 9, 1943, as Mrs. Kranz
Blossom Time, Dec 26, 1938 - Jan 1939, as Mrs. Kranz
The Love Song, Jan 13, 1925 - Jun 6, 1925, as Lizette
Springtime of Youth, Oct 26, 1922 - Dec 23, 1922, as Pepita
The Sweetheart Shop, Aug 31, 1920 - Oct 16, 1920, as Daphne

Filmography
Avenging Waters (1936) as "Mrs. Eloise Smythe"
Taming the Wild (1936) as "Mrs. Elizabeth Bolton"

References

Further reading
Boxoffice Magazine, Feb. 16, 1952 issue, pages 97 and 98
The Washington Post, December 9, 1917, "Makes Classics of Ragtime"

External links

1883 births
1952 deaths
People from Worcester County, Massachusetts
Vaudeville performers
Actresses from Massachusetts